Group J of UEFA Euro 2020 qualifying was one of the ten groups to decide which teams would qualify for the UEFA Euro 2020 finals tournament. Group J consisted of six teams: Armenia, Bosnia and Herzegovina, Finland, Greece, Italy and Liechtenstein, where they played against each other home-and-away in a round-robin format.

The top two teams, Italy and Finland, qualified directly for the finals. Unlike previous editions, the participants of the play-offs were not decided based on results from the qualifying group stage, but instead based on their performance in the 2018–19 UEFA Nations League.

Italy won all ten of their matches, becoming only the sixth national side to qualify for a European Championship with a 100% record, and the seventh instance, after France (1992 and 2004), Czech Republic (2000), Germany, Spain (both 2012) and England (2016).

Standings

Matches
The fixtures were released by UEFA the same day as the draw, which was held on 2 December 2018 in Dublin. Times are CET/CEST, as listed by UEFA (local times, if different, are in parentheses).

Goalscorers

Discipline
A player was automatically suspended for the next match for the following offences:
 Receiving a red card (red card suspensions could be extended for serious offences)
 Receiving three yellow cards in three different matches, as well as after fifth and any subsequent yellow card (yellow card suspensions were not carried forward to the play-offs, the finals or any other future international matches)
The following suspensions were served during the qualifying matches:

Notes

References

External links
UEFA Euro 2020, UEFA.com
European Qualifiers, UEFA.com

Group J
2018–19 in Armenian football
2019–20 in Armenian football
2018–19 in Bosnia and Herzegovina football
2019–20 in Bosnia and Herzegovina football
2019 in Finnish football
Finland at UEFA Euro 2020
2018–19 in Greek football
2019–20 in Greek football
2018–19 in Italian football
2019–20 in Italian football
Italy at UEFA Euro 2020
2018–19 in Liechtenstein football
2019–20 in Liechtenstein football